Richard Xavier Slattery (June 26, 1925 – January 27, 1997) was an American character actor in film, theater and television. Slattery appeared in such films as A Distant Trumpet, The Boston Strangler, Walking Tall, The No Mercy Man and Herbie Rides Again.

Early years
Born in New York, Slattery was a graduate of All Hallows High School who briefly studied at Fordham University, where he had scholarships in track and football. He left Fordham and enlisted in the United States Army Air Forces during World War II, serving as a lieutenant in the Pacific for two and a half years. He was awarded the American Campaign Medal, the Asiatic-Pacific Campaign Medal and the World War II Victory Medal.

Career
Slattery was distinguished by a square-jawed look and a rough, gravelly voice that made him ideal as a "tough guy" character, usually as  a cop or a drill sergeant type. He had been an NYPD police officer for 12 years (1948–1960) and started his acting career in police academy training films, and in community theater in the Bronx.

Slattery was a familiar face on series television during the 1960s thru the 1980s, appearing in numerous guest roles including Route 66, The Alfred Hitchcock Hour, 77 Sunset Strip, Gunsmoke, Rawhide, The Andy Griffith Show, Bewitched, The Invaders, F Troop, The Green Hornet, The Virginian, Bonanza, The Partridge Family, The Odd Couple, Owen Marshall: Counselor at Law, The Mod Squad,  Emergency!, Run, Joe, Run, The Waltons, Ironside, Kojak, The San Pedro Beach Bums, and Knight Rider.

Slattery starred in a revival of the play The Time of Your Life, starting March 17, 1972, at the Huntington Hartford Theater in Los Angeles.

For 14 years, Slattery was featured in a series of popular TV commercials for 76 gasoline during the 1970s and early 1980s, playing Murph, the grandfatherly owner of "Murph's 76 Station" (filmed at the longtime 76 station adjacent to Dodger Stadium in Los Angeles). He played Lieutenant Modeen in Switch and had featured roles in three series: The Gallant Men (as 1st Sgt. John McKenna), Mister Roberts (as Captain John Morton), and C.P.O. Sharkey (as Captain "Buck" Buckner). Slattery appeared in the Barnaby Jones episode titled "The Loose Connection" (March 18, 1973). He appeared on the Cannon episode, "The Cure That Kills," as a carnival owner, an episode that first aired on February 20, 1974.

Personal life
Slattery was married to Pegeen Rose, an actress, from 1958 to 1968. They had five children. He married Mary Shelquist in 1970 and they divorced in 1979.  He married Helene Irene Vergauwen in 1988 and they remained married until his death. His son, Kevin, is a television producer (Just Shoot Me).

Death
Slattery died on January 27, 1997, at the Motion Picture & Television Hospital in Woodland Hills, CA. The official cause of death was listed as a stroke.

Filmography

References

External links

1925 births
1997 deaths
Male actors from New York City
American male stage actors
American male film actors
American male television actors
People from the Bronx
New York City Police Department officers
Warner Bros. contract players
20th-century American male actors
United States Army Air Forces personnel of World War II
United States Army Air Forces officers